Łąkociny may refer to the following places in Poland:
Łąkociny, Lower Silesian Voivodeship (south-west Poland)
Łąkociny, Greater Poland Voivodeship (west-central Poland)